The yellow kiwi or golden kiwifruit (t/a Kiwi Gold) is a variety of kiwifruit developed by the company Zespri International Ltd. The yellow kiwi is a different species (Actinidia chinensis) but of the same genus as the green one (Actinidia deliciosa).

History 
In 1977, New Zealand agronomists from Zespri transported A. chinensis seeds from China to the Bay of Plenty in New Zealand, where green kiwifruit had been cultivated for years. After a selection process, in 1992 a strain was obtained that had yellow and sweet pulp. It was designated as Hort-16A.

Commercialization 
In 1998, Zespri introduced the yellow kiwi in the Japanese market, and in 2000 in Europe.

Characteristics 
In terms of organoleptic properties, the yellow kiwi has a less hard texture, and its skin is finer, smoother and less rough than the green kiwi fruit. The yellow kiwi has a yellowish color and is sweeter.

In terms of size and weight, it does not show significant differences (between 5 and 8 cm long).

Agronomy 
Cultivation of the yellow variety is less widespread due in part to its high susceptibility to bacteriosis, especially canker (also known as PSA (Pseudomonas syringae pv. actinidiae)). The first cultivar of gold kiwifruit, Hort16A, which is marketed internationally as ZespriGold, suffered significant losses in New Zealand between 2010 and 2013 due to a PSA outbreak. In 2012, almost half of New Zealand's yellow kiwifruit was lost, so Zespri developed a new variety, SunGold. A new variety called Zesy002 was discovered, which was resistant to PSA.

Cultivars 
Some varieties of yellow kiwi are:

 AC1536 or Dori, a relative of Dori Europe developed by Consorzio Dori Europe, highly productive, yellow intense and very early variety
 A-19 or Enza Gold, the variety most similar to the green kiwifruit, both in acidity and in external appearance;
 Hort16A or Zespri Gold, the first variety of yellow kiwi;
 JB Gold or Kiwi Kiss, highly productive and large
 Jintao or Jin Gold, highly productive, smaller than Hort16A and of Chinese origin;
 Soreli, highly productive, of Italian origin;
 SunGold, a relative of Zespri Gold developed by Zespri;

See also 
 Hayward, the most cultivated kiwifruit variety

References 

Food plant cultivars
Kiwifruit